Senator Goss may refer to:

Edward W. Goss (1893–1972), Connecticut State Senate
Ephraim Goss (1806–1877), New York State Senate
Steve Goss (1949–2015), North Carolina Senate